Microloxia is a genus of moths family in the family Geometridae described by Warren in 1893.

Species
Microloxia chlorissoides (Prout, 1912) eastern Asia
Microloxia herbaria (Hübner, [1813]) Europe and North Africa
Microloxia indecretata (Walker, [1863]) India
Microloxia ruficornis Warren, 1897 northern Africa, Sahara, Madagascar, South Africa, Arabia, southern Iraq, southern Iran
Microloxia schmitzi
Microloxia simonyi

References

"Microloxia Warren, 1893". Fauna Europaea. Retrieved April 15, 2019.

Microloxiini